Garra naganensis (Naga garra) is a species of ray-finned fish in the genus Garra, widespread in northeastern India.

References 

Garra
Taxa named by Sunder Lal Hora
Fish described in 1921